Chlamydia is a genus of pathogenic Gram-negative bacteria that are obligate intracellular parasites. Chlamydia infections are the most common bacterial sexually transmitted diseases in humans and are the leading cause of infectious blindness worldwide.

Species include Chlamydia trachomatis (a human pathogen), Ch. suis (affects only swine), and Ch. muridarum (affects only mice and hamsters). Humans mainly contract Ch. trachomatis, Ch. pneumoniae, Ch. abortus, and Ch. psittaci.

Classification
Because of Chlamydias unique developmental cycle, it was taxonomically classified in a separate order. Chlamydia is part of the order Chlamydiales, family Chlamydiaceae.

In the early 1990s six species of Chlamydia were known. A major re-description of the Chlamydiales order in 1999, using the then new techniques of DNA analysis, split three of the species from the genus Chlamydia and reclassified them in the then newly created genus Chlamydophila, and also added three new species to this genus. In 2001 many bacteriologists strongly objected to the reclassification, although in 2006 some scientists still supported the distinctness of Chlamydophila. In 2009 the validity of Chlamydophila was challenged by newer DNA analysis techniques, leading to a proposal to "reunite the Chlamydiaceae into a single genus, Chlamydia". This appears to have been accepted by the community, bringing the number of (valid) Chlamydia species up to 9. Many probable species were subsequently isolated, but no one bothered to name them. In 2013 a 10th species was added, Ch. ibidis, known only from feral sacred ibis in France. Two more species were added in 2014 (but validated 2015): Ch. avium which infects pigeons and parrots, and Ch. gallinacea infecting chickens, guinea fowl and turkeys. Ch. abortus was added in 2015, and the Chlamydophila species reclassified. A number of new species were originally classified as aberrant strains of Ch. psittaci

Genomes
Chlamydia species have genomes around 1.0 to 1.3 megabases in length. Most encode ~900 to 1050 proteins.  Some species also contain a DNA plasmids or phage genomes (see Table). The elementary body contains an RNA polymerase responsible for the transcription of the DNA genome after entry into the host cell cytoplasm and the initiation of the growth cycle. Ribosomes and ribosomal subunits are found in these bodies.

Table 1. Genome features of selected Chlamydia species and strains. MoPn is a mouse pathogen while strain "D" is a human pathogen. About 80% of the genes in Ch. trachomatis and Ch. pneumoniae are orthologs. Adapted after Read et al. 2000

Developmental cycle 
Chlamydia may be found in the form of an elementary body and a reticulate body. The elementary body is the nonreplicating infectious particle that is released when infected cells rupture. It is responsible for the bacteria's ability to spread from person to person and is analogous to a spore. The elementary body may be 0.25 to 0.30 μm in diameter. This form is covered by a rigid cell wall (hence the combining form chlamyd- in the genus name). The elementary body induces its own endocytosis upon exposure to target cells. One phagolysosome usually produces an estimated 100–1000 elementary bodies.

Chlamydia may also take the form of a reticulate body, which is in fact an intracytoplasmic form, highly involved in the process of replication and growth of these bacteria. The reticulate body is slightly larger than the elementary body and may reach up to 0.6 μm in diameter with a minimum of 0.5 μm. It does not have a cell wall. When stained with iodine, reticulate bodies appear as inclusions in the cell. The DNA genome, proteins, and ribosomes are retained in the reticulate body. This occurs as a result of the development cycle of the bacteria. The reticular body is basically the structure in which the chlamydial genome is transcribed into RNA, proteins are synthesized, and the DNA is replicated. The reticulate body divides by binary fission to form particles which, after synthesis of the outer cell wall, develop into new infectious elementary body progeny. The fusion lasts about three hours and the incubation period may be up to 21 days. After division, the reticulate body transforms back to the elementary form and is released by the cell by exocytosis.

Studies on the growth cycle of Ch. trachomatis and Ch. psittaci in cell cultures in vitro reveal that the infectious elementary body (EB) develops into a noninfectious reticulate body (RB) within a cytoplasmic vacuole in the infected cell. After the elementary body enters the infected cell, an eclipse phase of 20 hours occurs while the infectious particle develops into a reticulate body. The yield of chlamydial elementary bodies is maximal 36 to 50 hours after infection.

A histone like protein HctA and HctB play role in controlling  the differentiation between the two cell types. The expression of HctA is tightly regulated and repressed by small non-coding RNA, IhtA until the late RB to EB re-differentiation. The IhtA RNA is conserved across Chlamydia species.

Pathology
Most commonly, chlamydial infections do not cause symptoms. However, for men, a burning sensation when urinating is often probable. For women, odor and itching are possible symptoms. Both sexes may notice more sebum production as the infection escalates, all which produces greasy sweat, more oily complexion, and can be misdiagnosed as acne eruptions rather than the whole body's hidden fight to defend itself from an STD. All people who have engaged in sexual activity with potentially infected individuals may be offered one of several tests to diagnose the condition.

Chlamydia can be detected through culture tests or nonculture tests. The main nonculture tests include fluorescent monoclonal antibody test, enzyme immunoassay, DNA probes, rapid Chlamydia tests and leukocyte esterase tests. Whereas the first test can detect the major outer membrane protein (MOMP), the second detects a colored product converted by an enzyme linked to an antibody. The rapid Chlamydia tests use antibodies against the MOMP, the leukocyte esterase tests detect enzymes produced by leukocytes containing the bacteria in urine.

Evolution 
Recent phylogenetic studies have revealed that Chlamydia likely shares a common ancestor with cyanobacteria, the group containing the endosymbiont ancestor to the chloroplasts of modern plants, hence, Chlamydia retains unusual plant-like traits, both genetically and physiologically. In particular, the enzyme L,L-diaminopimelate aminotransferase, which is related to lysine production in plants, is also linked with the construction of chlamydial peptidoglycan, which is required for division. The genetic encoding for the enzymes is remarkably similar in plants, cyanobacteria, and Chlamydia, demonstrating a close common ancestry.

Phylogeny

See also
 List of bacterial orders
 List of bacteria genera

References

Further reading
 
 Chlamydiae.com

Chlamydiota
Pathogenic bacteria
Bacteria genera